Poul Clemmensen (6 January 1922 – 16 September 1998) was a Danish actor. He appeared in fifteen films and television shows between 1954 and 1992.

Filmography

References

External links

1922 births
1998 deaths
Danish male film actors
Male actors from Copenhagen
20th-century Danish male actors